Léon Aimé Taverde, F.M.C  (17 July 1923 – 8 August 2013), was a French prelate of the Catholic Church. He was born in Avanne, France, and was ordained a priest on 25 September 1955. He was appointed bishop to the Diocese of Langres on 14 October 1981 and was ordained bishop on 29 November 1981. He retired on 16 December 1999 as bishop of the Langres Diocese.

References

External links

1923 births
2013 deaths
20th-century Roman Catholic bishops in France
21st-century Roman Catholic bishops in France